The Royole FlexPai is a phone made by the Chinese company Royole. It was the first commercially available foldable smartphone, with a 7.8 inch display that folds outwards. It was first announced at CES 2018 and it started shipping on December of the same year. The following year, Escobar Inc announced the Escobar Fold 1, which looked remarkably similar to a Royole FlexPai, but with a golden-colored body.

Specifications 
The Royole FlexPai ships with Android 9.0 "Pie".

The foldable smartphone runs features a single folding AMOLED display, comes with a 4,000 mAh and with a 16MP and 20MP dual-camera on its inner bezel. Aside from that, the phone also comes with a dual-SIM card setup, and features a fingerprint sensor.

Controversy 

The Escobar Fold 1 and Escobar Inc were banned from appearing at the 2020 CES event after the Consumer Technology Association, which runs CES, determined that the company was "not a good fit" for the show.
The Escobar Fold 1 has been deemed by some as a scam, with many customers not receiving their units or only receiving books from Escobar, along with a pamphlet that promises the delivery of an Escobar Fold 2 (a rebranded Galaxy Fold) by March, 2020. Escobar Inc CEO Olof Gustafsson stated that they were unable to obtain "high quality stock" of the Fold 1. He then accused Samsung of running a scam with its own Galaxy Fold device, without offering any evidence.

Legacy
It was succeeded by the Royole FlexPai 2.

See also
 Samsung Galaxy Note series
 Huawei Mate X
 Motorola Razr (2020)
 Comparison of smartphones

References

Mobile phones introduced in 2019
Smartphones
Android (operating system) devices
Mobile phones with multiple rear cameras
Foldable smartphones